Abdul Aziz Ismail (born 12 June 1981) is a retired Malaysian professional football player.

He is the former member of Malaysia national team and Malaysia under-23 national team. He represented the country in the 2001 and 2003 Southeast Asian Games, 2004 AFC Asian Cup qualifier and 2006 World Cup qualifier.

Honours

Penang FA
 Malaysia Premier 1 League: 2001

References

External links
 

1981 births
Living people
Malaysian footballers
Malaysia international footballers
Perlis FA players
Penang F.C. players
Sarawak FA players
People from Penang
Association football defenders